Yui Kamiji defeated the two-time defending champion Jiske Griffioen in the final, 6–7(2–7), 6–3, 6–3 to win the women's singles wheelchair tennis title at the 2017 Australian Open.

Seeds

Draw

Draw

References 

General

 Drawsheets on ausopen.com 

Specific

Wheelchair Women's Singles
2017 Women's Singles